White Oak is an unincorporated community in Morgan County, Kentucky, United States.  It lies along U.S. Route 460 southeast of the city of West Liberty, the county seat of Morgan County.  Its elevation is 801 feet (244 m).

References

Unincorporated communities in Morgan County, Kentucky
Unincorporated communities in Kentucky